Radio Impuls is a private radio station founded in the Czech Republic in 1999 when it replaced the nationwide station Rádio Alfa, which lost its license.. It is the most popular radio station in the country  by number of listeners (as of late 2014). Since 2014, it has been owned by Agrofert group, a company owned by Andrej Babiš, the second richest man and former Prime Minister of the Czech Republic.

The station broadcasts mostly Czech music, news, traffic information, and entertainment. In 2014, the company launched a second station called Czech Impuls, which mainly plays Czech songs, mostly from the 1960s to the 1980s.

References

External links
 Official website

Radio stations established in 1999
1999 establishments in the Czech Republic